The 2017 Korean Basketball League rookie draft (Korean: 2017 KBL 국내신인선수 드래프트) was held on October 30, 2017, at the Jamsil Students' Gymnasium in Seoul, South Korea. Out of the 44 participants, 27 players were drafted.

In September 2017, the KBL announced its confirmed list of 44 participants for the upcoming draft. The order of selection was chosen through two lotteries and announced on October 23. Busan KT Sonicboom won the right to the first overall pick and also obtained the second pick via a player trade with Changwon LG Sakers.

Draft selections
This table only shows the first twenty picks.

Players
Traditionally, players joined the draft after completing their senior season and were fourth-year students at their respective universities. This draft marked the first time two freshmen, Yang Hong-seok and Yoo Hyun-jun, were picked so early in the first round, leading observers and pundits to note that "early entry" would likely become a trend in Korean basketball in the future. Point guard Heo Hoon became the first Yonsei University player since Ha Seung-jin in 2008 to be picked first overall.

In March 2021, Yang and Heo simultaneously recorded double-doubles during the play-offs against Anyang KGC. It marked the first time in KBL history two domestic players from the same team simultaneously recorded double-doubles in a single game.

Notes

See also
Korean Basketball League draft

References

External links
 Draft: 2017 KBL Domestic Player draft results / 드래프트: 2017 KBL 국내신인선수 드래프트 결과 — Korean Basketball League official website 

Korean Basketball League draft
Korean Basketball League draft
2010s in Seoul
Korean Basketball League draft
Sport in Seoul
Events in Seoul